Ramsayornis is a genus of bird in the family Meliphagidae. It is found from Northern Australia to New Guinea. This genus of bird is characterized by the small size, pale ventral plumage with incomplete barring, and unmarked white throat and undertail. It contains the following species:

References 

 
Bird genera
Taxonomy articles created by Polbot